, nicknamed , is a Japanese female kickboxer and mixed martial artist. Inoue has fought in the kickboxing promotion J-Girls and MMA promotion Jewels. She won the 2010 Jewels -56 kg Rough Stone Grand Prix tournament at 16 years of age, becoming one of the youngest female champions in a major MMA promotion.

On , Inoue became the 2012 Shoot Boxing Girls S-Cup 53.5-kilogram tournament champion.

Background
She started training karate in fourth grade when she accompanied her brother to his karate lesson. A year later, Inoue joined Hakushinkai Karate and also began training mixed martial arts (MMA). At 11 years old, Inoue met her karate and current main coach, Sadanori Yamaguchi, who is also the head of Hakushinkai Karate in Toyohashi, Aichi. He was the one who encouraged her to start MMA as he himself became interested in MMA after watching fellow karateka Minoki Ichihara, a Daido Juku champion, fall to Royce Gracie during UFC 2. At 15 years old, Inoue debuted professionally in shoot boxing prior to MMA due to believing that she had to be 18 years old to compete in MMA.

Kickboxing and shoot boxing career
She faced Kanako Oka and was defeated by majority decision.

At this event, Inoue began using the ring name Mizuki instead of her real name, which she used in her previous amateur kickboxing bouts.

She defeated Satake by majority decision.

She defeated Jinnai by unanimous decision after one extension round.

She defeated Natsuka by unanimous decision.

Inoue suffered her first professional loss in a kickboxing rules match at J-Girls 2011: Born This Way 2nd on  when she was defeated by Yukino Oishi via majority decision in the J-Girls bantamweight tournament final.

In an upset, Inoue defeated Takahashi by unanimous decision after one extension round.

She won the fight by referee stoppage in the third round to advance to the Shoot Boxing Girls S-Cup 53.5 tournament final.

She defeated Takahashi by unanimous decision after six rounds to become the first Shoot Boxing Girls S-Cup 53.5 champion.

On , Inoue entered the 2013 Shoot Boxing Girls S-Cup 53.5 tournament. She defeated Izumi Noguchi, Miyo Yoshida and Ai Takahashi in one night to become the 2013 Shoot Boxing Girls S-Cup 53.5 champion.

Grappling matches
On , Inoue faced Yukiko Suzuki in a grappling match at Jewels 21st Ring. She defeated Suzuki by technical submission due to an armbar in just 56 seconds.

She was defeated by unanimous decision.

Mixed martial arts career

Jewels 
At just 16 years old, Inoue debuted in MMA at Jewels 10th Ring on  during the 2010 Rough Stone Grand Prix -56 kg tournament, submitting the more mature Abe Ani Combat Club member Emi Murata with an armbar in the second round.

On  at Jewels 11th Ring, Inoue defeated the more experienced Asako Saioka via technical submission (referee stoppage, armbar) to win the 2010 Rough Stone GP -56 kg tournament.

She was defeated by unanimous decision.

She defeated Chambers by submission due to an armbar in the first round.

On , Inoue faced Hyo Kyung Song at Jewels 22nd Ring. She defeated Song by submission due to an armbar in the second round.

However, Chan suffered an injury and Inoue instead faced Seo Ye Jung. She defeated Jung by submission due to a rear-naked choke in the first round.

Inoue won the fight via unanimous decision.

She won the fight by unanimous decision.

On , Inoue faced Emi Tomimatsu to determine the inaugural Deep Jewels lightweight champion.
Mizuki Inoue finished the match at 3:57 of the 3rd round via armbar, but was disqualified for not being able to make weight. Emi Tomimatsu was crowned the new champion.

Invicta Fighting Championship 

Inoue was scheduled to face Milana Dudieva on March 24, 2018, at Invicta FC 28: Morandin vs. Jandiroba, however Morandin pulled out of the fight with Jandiroba, allowing Mizuki to step up into the main event which was for the vacant Invicta FC strawweight championship which she lost via split decision.

Inoue was scheduled to face Heather Jo Clark on November 16, 2018, at Invicta FC 32: Spencer vs. Sorenson. It was reported that Clark pulled out from the event and she was replaced by Viviane Pereira. At the weigh-ins, Inoue weighed in at 116.4 pounds, 0.4 pound over the strawweight non-title fight limit of 116. She was fined 25 percent of her purse, which went to her opponents Pereira and the fight proceeded to a catchweight bout. Inoue won the fight via unanimous decision.

Ultimate Fighting Championship 

Inoue faced Yanan Wu, replacing Luana Carolina, on August 31, 2019, at UFC on ESPN+ 15. At the weigh-ins, Wu weighed in at 128 Ibs, 3 pounds over the non-title fight limit. Wu was fined 30% of her purse to Inoue and the bout proceeded at catchweight. Mizuki won the fight via split decision.

Inoue was scheduled to face Tecia Torres on March 28, 2020, at UFC on ESPN: Ngannou vs. Rozenstruik. Due to the COVID-19 pandemic, the event was eventually postponed .

Inoue faced Amanda Lemos August 22, 2020 at UFC on ESPN 15. She lost the fight via unanimous decision.

In November 2020, Inoue underwent surgery to repair an anterior cruciate ligament injury.

Mixed martial arts record

|Loss
|align=center|14–6
|Amanda Lemos
|Decision (unanimous)
|UFC on ESPN: Munhoz vs. Edgar
|
|align=center|3
|align=center|5:00
|Las Vegas, Nevada, United States
|
|-
|Win
|align=center|14–5
|Wu Yanan
|Decision (split)
|UFC Fight Night: Andrade vs. Zhang
|
|align=center|3
|align=center|5:00
|Shenzhen, China
|
|-
|Win
|align=center|13–5
|Viviane Pereira
|Decision (unanimous)
|Invicta FC 32: Spencer vs. Sorenson
|
|align=center|3
|align=center|5:00
|Shawnee, Oklahoma, United States
|
|-
|Loss
|align=center|12–5
|Virna Jandiroba
|Decision (split)
|Invicta FC 28: Mizuki vs. Jandiroba
|
|align=center|5
|align=center|5:00
|Salt Lake City, Utah, United States
|
|-
|Win
|align=center|12–4
|Lynn Alvarez
|Submission (armbar)
|Invicta FC 18: Grasso vs. Esquibel
|
|align=center|2
|align=center|3:00
|Kansas City, Missouri, United States
| 
|-
|Win
|align=center|11–4
|Nori Date
|Submission (armbar)
|Deep: Jewels 11
|
|align=center|1
|align=center|3:12
|Tokyo, Japan
|
|-
|Win
|align=center|10–4
|Lacey Schuckman
|Submission (armbar)
|Invicta FC 15: Cyborg vs. Ibragimova
|
|align=center|3
|align=center|3:41
|Costa Mesa, California, United States
|
|-
|Win
|align=center|9–4
|Emi Fujino
|Decision (unanimous)
|Deep: Jewels 9
|
|align=center|3
|align=center|5:00
|Tokyo, Japan
|
|-
|Loss
|align=center|8–4
|Alexa Grasso
|Decision (unanimous)
|Invicta FC 11: Cyborg vs. Tweet
|
|align=center|3
|align=center|5:00
|Los Angeles, California, United States
|
|-
|Loss
|align=center|8–3
|Karolina Kowalkiewicz
|Decision (split)
|Invicta FC 9: Honchak vs. Hashi
|
|align=center|3 
|align=center|5:00
|Davenport, Iowa, United States
|
|-
|Win
|align=center|8–2
|Emi Tomimatsu
|Submission (armbar)
|Deep: Jewels 5
|
|align=center|3
|align=center|1:33
|Tokyo, Japan
|
|-
| Loss
|align=center| 7–2
| Emi Tomimatsu
| DQ (overturned)
| Deep: Jewels 3
| 
|align=center| 3
|align=center| 3:57
| Tokyo, Japan
|
|-
| Win
|align=center| 7–1
| Emi Fujino
| Decision (unanimous)
| Deep: Jewels 2
| 
|align=center| 2 
|align=center| 5:00
| Tokyo, Japan
| 
|-
| Win
|align=center| 6–1
| Bec Rawlings
| Decision (unanimous)
| Invicta FC 6: Coenen vs. Cyborg
| 
|align=center| 3 
|align=center| 5:00
| Kansas City, Missouri, United States
|
|-
| Win
|align=center| 5–1
| Seo Ye Jung
| Submission (rear-naked choke)
| Jewels 23rd Ring
| 
|align=center| 1
|align=center| 1:43
| Tokyo, Japan
| 
|-
| Win
|align=center| 4–1
| Hyo Kyung Song
| Submission (armbar)
| Jewels 22nd Ring
| 
|align=center| 2
|align=center| 2:14
| Tokyo, Japan
| 
|-
| Win
|align=center| 3–1
| Alex Chambers
| Submission (armbar)
| Jewels 18th Ring
| 
|align=center| 1
|align=center| 4:32
| Tokyo, Japan
| 
|-
| Loss
|align=center| 2–1
| Ayaka Hamasaki
| Decision (unanimous)
| Jewels 16th Ring
| 
|align=center| 2
|align=center| 5:00
| Tokyo, Japan
|
|-
| Win
|align=center| 2–0
| Asako Saioka
| Technical submission (armbar)
| Jewels 11th Ring
| 
|align=center| 1
|align=center| 2:59
| Tokyo, Japan
| 
|-
| Win
|align=center| 1–0
| Emi Murata
| Submission (armbar)
| Jewels 10th Ring
| 
|align=center| 2
|align=center| 2:58
| Tokyo, Japan
|

Kickboxing and shoot boxing record

Legend:

Championships and accomplishments

Mixed martial arts

Invicta Fighting Championships
Fight of the Night (Two times) vs. Karolina Kowalkiewicz and Alexa Grasso
Deep Jewels
Strawweight Champion (one time; current)
 2010 Jewels Rough Stone Grand Prix 56 kg tournament winner
MMAJunkie.com
2015 February Fight of the Month vs. Alexa Grasso

Shoot boxing

Girls S-Cup
2012 Shoot Boxing Girls S-Cup 53.5 kg tournament winner
2013 Shoot Boxing Girls S-Cup 53.5 kg tournament winner

See also
 List of female mixed martial artists
 List of female kickboxers

References

External links
 
 Mizuki Inoue at Invicta FC
 Mizuki Inoue at AwakeningFighters.com
 Mizuki Inoue at Shoot boxing  (archived)
 Mizuki Inoue at J-Girls 
 
  
 Official blog (inactive) 

1994 births
Japanese female kickboxers
Japanese female mixed martial artists
Living people
People from Toyohashi
Sportspeople from Aichi Prefecture
Japanese female karateka
Strawweight mixed martial artists
Flyweight mixed martial artists
Mixed martial artists utilizing karate
Mixed martial artists utilizing shootboxing
Ultimate Fighting Championship female fighters